Minuscule 78 (in the Gregory-Aland numbering), ε 1209 (von Soden), is a Greek minuscule manuscript of the New Testament, on parchment leaves. Palaeographically it has been assigned to the 12th century. It has complex contents and full marginalia.

Description 

The codex contains complete text of the four Gospels with a commentary on 296 leaves (size ). The text is written in one column per page, 22 lines per page. The initial letters in red.

Text 

The Greek text of the codex is a representative of the Byzantine text-type. Hermann von Soden classified it to the textual family Kx. Aland placed it in Category V.
According to the Claremont Profile Method it represents the textual cluster 127 in Luke 1 and Luke 20. In Luke 10 no profile was made. It is close to 1052.

History 

The manuscript was once in the library of King Matthias Corvinus (as codex 77). In 1527 the library was scattered by Turks. About 1686 the codex fell into the hands of S. B., then of J. G. Carpzov of Leipzig. It was collated by C. F. Boerner.

It is currently housed at the Országos Széchényi Könyvtár (Cod. Graec. 1), at Budapest.

See also 

 List of New Testament minuscules
 Biblical manuscript
 Textual criticism

References

Further reading 

 

Greek New Testament minuscules
12th-century biblical manuscripts